Iris Wang (born September 2, 1994) is an American badminton player who competed at the 2016 Summer Olympics in Rio de Janeiro, Brazil.

Personal life 
Wang was born in Pasadena, California on September 2, 1994 to Chinese parents. Her older sister, Rena Wang, is also an international badminton player.

Career 
Wang won a bronze medal in the women's doubles at the 2010 Pan Am Badminton Championships playing alongside her sister Rena. In 2011, she was eliminated at the quarterfinal stage of the women's singles at the 2011 Pan American Games in Guadalajara, Jalisco, Mexico, after losing to Canadian player Michelle Li. Competing alongside her sister Rena, Wang won a silver medal in the women's doubles.

At the 2013 Pan Am Badminton Championships she won a silver medal in the team event as part of the United States squad. Wang won the gold medal at the 2014 Brazil International tournament, defeating Lohaynny Vicente in the final. She also won gold medals at the Mercosul International and Argentina International events. She was part of the United States squad that won a team silver medal at the 2014 Pan Am Badminton Championships.

At the 2015 Pan American Games held in Toronto, Ontario, Canada, Wang won a bronze medal in the women's singles. She defeated Damaris Ortiz Prada of Venezuela, Luana Vicente of Brazil and Daniela Macias of Peru, before losing her semifinal to Rachel Honderich of Canada.

In February 2016, Wang was part of the United States squad that won the women's team gold medal at the Pan American Team Continental Championships. Wang defeated Canada's Kyleigh O'Donoghue 21–12, 21–4, as the US won the final 3–2.

As of May 2016, Wang was ranked 33rd in the world for women's singles. The 34 highest ranked athletes, with a maximum of two per nation, earned qualification for the women's singles event in at the 2016 Summer Olympics in Rio de Janeiro, Brazil. The United States Olympic Committee confirmed Wang's place in the United States team on May 10, 2016.

Achievements

Pan American Games 
Women's singles

Women's doubles

Pan American Championships 
Women's singles

Women's doubles

BWF World Tour (1 runner-up)
The BWF World Tour, which was announced on March 19, 2017 and implemented in 2018, is a series of elite badminton tournaments sanctioned by the Badminton World Federation (BWF). The BWF World Tour is divided into levels of World Tour Finals, Super 1000, Super 750, Super 500, Super 300 (part of the HSBC World Tour), and the BWF Tour Super 100.

Women's singles

BWF International Challenge/Series (6 titles, 5 runners-up)
Women's singles

Women's doubles

  BWF International Challenge tournament
  BWF International Series tournament
  BWF Future Series tournament

References

External links 
 
 
 

1994 births
Living people
American sportspeople of Chinese descent
American female badminton players
Badminton players at the 2016 Summer Olympics
Olympic badminton players of the United States
Badminton players at the 2011 Pan American Games
Badminton players at the 2015 Pan American Games
Badminton players at the 2019 Pan American Games
Pan American Games silver medalists for the United States
Pan American Games bronze medalists for the United States
Pan American Games medalists in badminton
Medalists at the 2011 Pan American Games
Medalists at the 2015 Pan American Games
Medalists at the 2019 Pan American Games
21st-century American women